"Let's Chase Each Other Around the Room" is a song co-written and recorded by American country music artist Merle Haggard backed by The Strangers.  It was released in July 1984 as the first single from the album It's All in the Game.  The song was Haggard's thirty-second number one country single as a solo artist.  The single went to number one for one week and spent a total of twelve weeks on the country chart.  Haggard wrote the song with Freddy Powers and Sherill Rodgers.

Personnel
Merle Haggard– vocals, guitar, fiddle

The Strangers:
Roy Nichols - lead guitar
Norm Hamlet – steel guitar
Tiny Moore – fiddle, mandolin
Mark Yeary – keyboards
Dennis Hromek - bass
Biff Adams - drums
Jim Belken – fiddle
Don Markham – horns

Chart performance

References

1984 singles
Merle Haggard songs
Songs written by Merle Haggard
Epic Records singles
Song recordings produced by Ray Baker (music producer)
1984 songs
Songs written by Freddy Powers